Fergal Aidne mac Artgaile (died 696) was a King of Connacht from the Ui Fiachrach Aidhne branch of the Connachta. He was the grandson of Guaire Aidne mac Colmáin (died 663), the hero of many Irish sagas, and was the last member of this branch to hold the overlordship of Connacht.

The kinglists have misplaced his reign by placing it after Cellach mac Rogallaig (died 705) but the annals such as the Annals of Tigernach give him a reign after Dúnchad Muirisci mac Tipraite (died 683) in the years 683–696. Nothing is recorded of his reign however.

The lines descended from Fergal (the Cenel Guairi) included the O'Heynes and O'Clearys while the O’Shaughnessys descended from his brother Aed (Cenel nAeda).

Notes

See also
Kings of Connacht

References

 Annals of Tigernach
 Francis J.Byrne, Irish Kings and High-Kings
 Book of Leinster,Section 30
 Laud Synchronisms
 The Chronology of the Irish Annals, Daniel P. McCarthy
 Clans and Families of Ireland and Scotland, C. Thomas Cairney, Ph.D,

External links
CELT: Corpus of Electronic Texts at University College Cork

696 deaths
Kings of Connacht
7th-century Irish monarchs
People from County Galway
Year of birth unknown